Mark Morrison (born 1972) is a British R&B singer.

Mark Morrison may also refer to:

Mark Morrison (ice hockey, born 1963), Canadian ice hockey player
Mark Morrison (ice hockey, born 1982), Ice hockey player from Northern Ireland
Mark Coxon Morrison (1877–1945), British rugby union footballer